Muhammad Asif Khan (born 19 November 1954) is a Pakistani geologist and current Vice-Chancellor of University of Peshawar.

Education 

Khan got his D.I.C and Ph.D. in 1988 from Imperial College London, B.Sc (Hons) and MSc Geology in 1980 from the University of Peshawar and four Post-Doctoral Fellowship at University of Oxford, the University of Texas at Dallas and Penn State University and Lehigh University.

Awards and honors 
 Tamgha-e-Imtiaz (2000) 
 Fellowship of the Geological Society of London (2008)
 Fellowship of Pakistan Academy of Sciences (2009)
 HEC Distinguished National Professor (2012)

References 

Living people
University of Peshawar alumni
Pakistani academic administrators
Pakistani geologists
Recipients of Tamgha-e-Imtiaz
Vice-Chancellors of universities in Pakistan
Fellows of Pakistan Academy of Sciences
Alumni of Imperial College London
University of Texas at Dallas alumni
Vice-Chancellors of the University of Peshawar
Fellows of the Geological Society of London
1954 births